Sweetwater Lake State Park is a Colorado State Park in Garfield County, Colorado in the United States, approximately  north of the town of Dotsero. The park contains  and is located within the White River National Forest in the Flat Tops Wilderness Area. The park is unique in that it is the first state park in the nation to be created from land owned by the United States Forest Service. Governor Jared Polis announced the creation of the park, Colorado's 43rd, on October 20, 2021.

History 
The 72-acre natural lake and surrounding land was originally part of a privately owned ranch and had been considered for a golf course or housing developments. In order to protect the area from development, The Conservation Fund acquired the property in 2020 and held the parcel until the White River National Forest obtained a federal Land and Water Conservation Fund grant to purchase the property.

Activities 
Upon completion, the park will offer boating, camping, hiking, and picnic areas to visitors.

See also
 List of Colorado State Parks

References

External links
Sweetwater Lake State Park

Protected areas of Garfield County, Colorado
State parks of Colorado
Protected areas established in 2021